|}

This is a list of House of Assembly results for the 1956 Tasmanian election.

Results by division

Bass

Braddon

Denison

Franklin

Wilmot

See also 

 1956 Tasmanian state election
 Members of the Tasmanian House of Assembly, 1956–1959
 Candidates of the 1956 Tasmanian state election

References 

Results of Tasmanian elections
1956 in Australia